The following is a list of antisemitic incidents in the United States.

See also
 List of attacks on Jewish institutions in the United States

References

Antisemitic incidents in the United States
Judaism-related lists